William Adams (1716–1763) was an officer of the Royal Navy who served as captain of British flagship  during the Seven Years' War.

Adams was born in England in 1716 and joined the Royal Navy in the 1740s. His first service was aboard the 44-gun , followed by postings to the 14-gun sloop ,  and the 24-gun . On 26 March 1750 he passed his lieutenant's examinations and was transferred to the 64-gun . In 1757 he again transferred, this time to Vice-Admiral Edward Boscawen's flagship, the 100-gun .

References

Footnotes

Bibliography

1716 births
1763 deaths
Royal Navy officers
Place of birth missing
Royal Navy personnel of the Seven Years' War